The 18th Annual Australian Recording Industry Association Music Awards (generally known as ARIA Music Awards or simply the ARIAs) were held on 17 October 2004 at the Sydney SuperDome within the Sydney Olympic Complex. The ceremony, hosted by Rove McManus and produced by Roving Enterprises for Network Ten, was held for the first time on a Sunday night and averaged 1.39 million viewers. The 2004 ARIA Fine Arts Awards had been presented at a ceremony weeks earlier.

Awards
Winners highlighted in bold, with nominees, in plain, below them.

ARIA Awards
Album of the Year
Jet – Get Born
Eskimo Joe – A Song Is a City
John Butler Trio – Sunrise Over Sea
Kasey Chambers – Wayward Angel
The Dissociatives – The Dissociatives
Single of the Year
Jet – "Are You Gonna Be My Girl"
Eskimo Joe – "From the Sea"
John Butler Trio – "Zebra"
Missy Higgins – "Scar"
Pete Murray – "So Beautiful"
Best Male Artist
John Butler – Sunrise Over Sea
Alex Lloyd – Distant Light
Dan Kelly – Sing the Tabloid Blues
Pete Murray – "So Beautiful"
Tim Rogers – Spit Polish
Best Female Artist
Kasey Chambers – Wayward Angel
Delta Goodrem – "Not Me, Not I"
Kylie Minogue – Body Language
Lisa Miller – Version Originale
Missy Higgins – "Scar"
Best Group
Jet – Get Born
Eskimo Joe – A Song Is a City
Powderfinger – "Sunsets"
The Cat Empire – The Cat Empire
The Dissociatives – The Dissociatives
Highest Selling Album
Delta Goodrem – Innocent Eyes
Guy Sebastian – Just as I Am
Jet – Get Born
Pete Murray – Feeler
Shannon Noll – That's What I'm Talking About
Highest Selling Single
Guy Sebastian – "Angels Brought Me Here"
Delta Goodrem – "Predictable"
Paulini – "Angel Eyes"
Shannon Noll – "What About Me?"
Spiderbait – "Black Betty"
Best Breakthrough Artist – Album
Jet – Get Born
Dallas Crane – Dallas Crane
Dan Kelly and the Alpha Males – Sing the Tabloid Blues
The Cat Empire – The Cat Empire
Xavier Rudd – Solace
Best Breakthrough Artist – Single
Jet – "Are You Gonna Be My Girl"
Dallas Crane – "Dirty Hearts"
Little Birdy – "Relapse"
Missy Higgins – "Scar"
The Cat Empire – "Days Like These"
Best Adult Contemporary Album
Paul Kelly – Ways & Means
Diesel – Singled Out
george – Unity
Jimmy Little – Life's What You Make It
Lisa Miller – Version Originale
Best Blues & Roots Album
John Butler Trio – Sunrise Over Sea
Ash Grunwald – I Don't Believe
Jeff Lang – Whatever Makes You Happy
Jim Conway's Big Wheel – Little Story
Xavier Rudd – Solace
Best Children's Album
Hi-5 – Holiday
Amica – Life Is Fun
The Hooley Dooleys – Wonderful
The Saddle Club – Friends Forever
The Wiggles – Top of the Tots
Best Comedy Release
Scared Weird Little Guys – Bits and Pieces
Lee Perry & Gary Eck – The Hollywood Motel
Reg Reagan – Am I Ever Gonna See the Biff Again?
Tripod – About an Hour of Song in an Hour...Again
Tripod – Live – Fegh Maha
Best Country Album
Kasey Chambers – Wayward Angel
Adam Brand – Get Loud
Melinda Schneider – Family Tree
Slim Dusty – Columbia Lane – the Last Sessions
Troy Cassar-Daley – Borrowed & Blue
Best Dance Release
Infusion – "Girls Can Be Cruel"
Cam Farrar – Wasted
Cut Copy – "Future"
NuBreed – The Original
Mr Timothy – "I Am Tha 1"
Best Independent Release
John Butler Trio – Sunrise Over Sea
Butterfingers – Breakfast at Fatboys
Dan Kelly and the Alpha Males – Sing the Tabloid Blues
Jebediah – Braxton Hicks
The Waifs – "Bridal Train"
Best Music DVD
Midnight Oil – Best of Both Worlds
Grinspoon – 23 Hours of Waiting Around
INXS – I'm Only Looking
Pete Murray – Passing Time
You Am I – The Cream & the Crock
Best Pop Release
Missy Higgins – "Scar"
Delta Goodrem – "Not Me, Not I"
The Dissociatives – The Dissociatives
Kylie Minogue – Body Language
Pete Murray – "So Beautiful"
Best Rock Album
Jet – Get Born
Dallas Crane – Dallas Crane
Eskimo Joe – A Song Is a City
Spiderbait – Tonight Alright
The Living End – Modern Artillery
Best Urban Release
Koolism – Part 3 – Random Thoughts
1200 Techniques – Consistency Theory
Daniel Merriweather – "City Rules"
J-Wess – J Wess Presents tha LP
The Cat Empire – The Cat Empire

Artisan Awards
Best Cover Art
James Hackett – The Dissociatives – The Dissociatives
James Bellesini, Love Police – The Vines – Winning Days; You Am I – The Cream & the Crock
Mathematics – Kasey Chambers – Wayward Angel
Peter Barrett & Eskimo Joe – Eskimo Joe – A Song Is a City
Tom Walker – John Butler Trio – Sunrise Over Sea
Best Video
James Hackett – The Dissociatives – "Somewhere Down the Barrel"
Claudia Castle – Pete Murray – "So Beautiful"
Nash Edgerton – The Sleepy Jackson – "Good Dancers"
Paul Butler, Scott Walton & 50/50 – Spiderbait – "Black Betty"
Squareyed Films – Missy Higgins – "Scar"
Engineer of the Year
Paul McKercher, Eskimo Joe – Eskimo Joe – A Song Is a City
Andy Baldwin – The Cat Empire – The Cat Empire
Brent Clark – Alex Lloyd – Distant Light
Matt Lovell – Jebediah – Braxton Hicks
Phil McKellar – Sunk Loto – Between Birth and Death
Robyn Mai – John Butler Trio – Sunrise Over Sea
Producer of the Year
Paul McKercher, Eskimo Joe – Eskimo Joe – A Song Is a City
Andy Baldwin & The Cat Empire – The Cat Empire – The Cat Empire
Daniel Johns & Paul Mac – The Dissociatives – The Dissociatives
John Butler – John Butler Trio – Sunrise Over Sea
Paul McKercher & Pete Murray – Pete Murray – "So Beautiful"

Fine Arts Awards
For the first time, in 2004, the ARIA Fine Arts Awards were presented at a separate ceremony held weeks earlier.

Best Classical Album
Teddy Tahu Rhodes – The Voice
Diana Doherty – Souvenirs
Gerard Willems, Sinfonia Australis – Beethoven Complete Piano Concertos
Sara Macliver, Sally-Anne Russell – Bach Arias and Duets
William Barton, Queensland Orchestra – Sculthorpe:Songs of Sea and Sky
Best Jazz Album
The Necks – Drive By
Alister Spence Trio – Flux
Michelle Nicolle – The Crying Game
Mike Nock's Big Small Band – Big Small Band Live
Paul Grabowsky – Tales of Time and Space
Best Original Soundtrack / Cast / Show Recording
David Bridie – Nautical Forlorn
Australian Chamber Orchestra – Musical Renegades
Decoder Ring – Somersault (original soundtrack)
Elizabeth Drake – Japanese Story
Various – Australian Idol Final 12
Best World Music Album
Seaman Dan – Perfect Pearl
Jane Rutter, Slava Grigoryan – Brazil
Joseph Tawadros – Storyteller
Mohamed Bangoura – Djembe Kan
Saltwater Band – Djarridjarri – Blue Flag

ARIA Hall of Fame inductee
Little River Band

1970s members of Little River Band: Beeb Birtles, David Briggs, Graeham Goble, George McArdle, Derek Pellicci and Glenn Shorrock, were inducted into the Hall of Fame. The later members including fellow Australian, John Farnham, and US-based musicians, were not included in this induction. Due to a 2002 legal ruling on their right to use the band's name—two US-based members held the trademark—they performed as Classic Lineup of the Little River Band or Little River Band – Classic Lineup (sources vary). Shorrock had already been inducted into the Hall of Fame in 1991 and Farnham was inducted, for his solo work, in 2003.

Performers
The following artists performed on stage during the 2004 ARIA Awards:
Delta Goodrem
Eskimo Joe
Guy Sebastian
Kasey Chambers
Jet
John Butler Trio
Missy Higgins
Pete Murray
Shannon Noll
Spiderbait

Channel V Oz Artist of the Year award
Guy Sebastian
Jet
Delta Goodrem
Grinspoon
John Butler Trio

See also
Music of Australia
Rock music in Australia

References

ARIA Music Awards
2004 in Australian music
2004 music awards